En Manaivi is a 1942 Tamil-language comedy film produced by A. V. Meiyappan and directed by Sundar Rao Nadkarni. It is based on the Marathi stage play "Samshai Kolli" which in turn was based on the French playwright Molière's Self- deceived Husband.

Plot 
In Madras, a rich and handsome young Dhanapal Gupta is captivated by the beauty and chastity of a young dancer girl, Revathy,  of the dasi community. Against the wishes of her mother, they get married in  Rama temple with just themselves as witnesses.

Meanwhile, a middle aged Dr Vembu Iyer sets up his medical practice in a relatively obscure part of Madras – Kodambakkam. He is constantly worried about his feisty wife, Chellam, who always gives him the slip and escapes home everyday to meet up with her relatives or generally go out, which he hates. He would rather she stay at home. He is always suspicious about where she goes and laments to his patients at times. One day he walks out of his house and bumps into Revathy, who as it happens is feeling giddy and faints on the road. He rushes to hold her and brings her back to consciousness. Spotting this from her window an angry Chellam mistakes them to be lovers and storms out of the house. But by then, the other two have left the scene. The girl Revathy has dropped a framed picture of Dhanapal when she'd fainted and Chellam picks this up and walks inside.

Vembu Iyer comes back home and spies on his wife sitting on the bed admiringly looking at the picture of Dhanapal. The wife is wondering why the girl (Revathy) would leave such a handsome young man and fall for someone like her own husband. Iyer misunderstands this and thinks that she is talking about herself. He comes out of hiding and demands to know who her secret lover is. She in turn demands to know who that girl was who he was holding in his arms right in the middle of the road. They fight and he snatches the framed picture from her and storms out of the room.

The next few days Iyer goes around the city trying to search for his wife's 'secret lover' using the framed picture to compare faces. He finally spots Dhanapal at a park and shows him the picture. Dhanapal knows that the picture was with Revathy, and he is angered that it is now with some other man. He immediately assumes that Revathy and Iyer are lovers which is why it has come into his possession. He accuses Revathy of her infidelity and walks out of her house depressed.

How all these mistaken identities are resolved  forms the rest of the story.

Cast 

Male cast
 K. Sarangapani as Vembu Iyer
 K. Mahadevan as Dhanapal Gupta
 S. R. Krishna Iyengar as Gopal Gupta
 R. Natesa Iyer as Chef Subbu
 Appudu as Appayi
Male support cast
 N. S. Kannan, K. S. Jegadeeswara Iyer,K. V. Sornappa, G. Bhat and K. V. Shanmugam.

Female cast
 M. K. Meenalochani as Revathi
 K. R. Chellam as Chellam
 V. M. Pankajam as Baby
 R. Padma as Swathi
 T. R. Chandra as Rohini
 T. N. Chandramma as Dhanammal
 Lakshmikantham as Dhariha

Production 
After the success of his comedy Sabapathy, producer A. V. Meiyappan wanted to make another film in the same genre. He sought out Marathi film director Sundar Rao Nadkarni who had recently entered the Tamil film industry with Shantha Sakku Bai. The film was based on a Marathi stage play "Samshai Kolli" which in turn was based on French playwright Molière's Self- deceived Husband.

Soundtrack 
Lyrics were written by T. K. Sundara Vathiyar while the background music was provided by Saraswathi Stores Orchestra. The song Sangadamaana Samaiyalai vittu .. sung by R. Nadesan is a hit and popular even after 70 years. R. Padma danced to the song Ennilum Aval .. sung by P. A. Periyanayaki.

References

External links 
 

1940s Tamil-language films
1942 comedy films
1942 films
AVM Productions films
Films directed by Sundar Rao Nadkarni
Films scored by R. Sudarsanam
Indian black-and-white films
Indian comedy films
Indian films based on plays